Gökçeköy can refer to:

 Gökçeköy, Aladağ
 Gökçeköy, Sungurlu